Neutron is a medium-lift two-stage launch vehicle under development by Rocket Lab. Announced on 1 March 2021, the vehicle is being designed to be capable of delivering an  payload to low Earth orbit in a reusable configuration, and will focus on the growing megaconstellation satellite delivery market. The vehicle is expected to be operational sometime in 2024. It uses LOX and liquid methane propellant on both stages of the vehicle.

Design
Rocket Lab stated that they intended for the first stage of the vehicle to be reusable, with landings planned on a floating landing platform downrange in the Atlantic Ocean.

Rocket Lab abandoned plans for landing Neutron on a floating platform, instead opting for a return-to-launch-site reusability profile. Instead of a conventional payload fairing that is jettisoned and recovered at sea, the fairing is integrated into the vehicle, and opens during stage separation to release the second stage and payload, and then closes before the first stage lands back on earth. The rocket features a unique interstage design where the second stage is "hung" from the first stage structure.

On the 22nd of September 2022, another revised design was unveiled at an investor day, with the first stage engine count increased from seven to nine, and the engine architecture changed from gas-generator to oxygen rich staged combustion. This was done primarily to allow for a lower turbine temperature, while maintaining the same specific impulse. The engine will run with a significantly lower chamber pressure than other similar engines, at the cost of some performance. They have also reduced the number of fairing segments from four to two.

Operations
On 28 February 2022, Rocket Lab announced that Neutron will launch from the Mid-Atlantic Regional Spaceport (MARS) within NASA's Wallops Flight Facility on the eastern coast of Virginia. It was also announced that the company will build a 250,000 square feet manufacturing and operations facility adjacent to the Wallops Flight Facility.  Ground was broken for this facility on 11 April 2022. , Rocket Lab is planning for the first launch to take place no earlier than 2024.

Applications
Rocket Lab also intends the design to be able to eventually support human spaceflight.

References

External links 
 Neutron update on YouTube (2 December 2021)

Neutron
Reusable launch systems